Margaret Mitchell is a computer scientist who works on algorithmic bias and fairness in machine learning. She is most well known for her work on automatically removing undesired biases concerning demographic groups from machine learning models, as well as more transparent reporting of their intended use.

Education
Mitchell obtained a bachelor's degree in Linguistics from Reed College, Portland, Oregon, in 2005. After having worked as a research assistant at the OGI School of Science and Engineering for two years, she subsequently obtained a Master's in Computational Linguistics from the University of Washington in 2009. She enrolled in a PhD program at the University of Aberdeen, where she wrote a doctoral thesis on the topic of Generating Reference to Visible Objects, graduating in 2013.

Career and research 
In 2012, Mitchell joined the Human Language Technology Center of Excellence at Johns Hopkins University as a postdoctoral researcher, before taking up a position at Microsoft Research in 2013. She was subsequently employed at Google, where she founded and co-led the Ethical Artificial Intelligence team together with Timnit Gebru until her dismissal in February 2021.

Mitchell is most well known for her work on fairness in machine learning and methods for mitigating algorithmic bias. This includes her work on introducing the concept of 'Model Cards' for more transparent model reporting, and methods for debiasing machine learning models using adversarial learning. Margaret Mitchell created the framework for recognizing and avoiding biases by testing with a variable for the group of interest, predictor and an adversary.

At Microsoft, Mitchell was the research lead of the Seeing AI project, an app that offers support for the visually impaired by narrating texts and images. In February 2018, she gave a TED talk on 'How we can build AI to help humans, not hurt us'.

She was given the opportunity to begin a new position as a Senior Research Scientist at Google Research and Machine intelligence in November 2016. 

In February 2021, her employment at Google, where she was co-leading the Ethical Artificial Intelligence team with Timnit Gebru, was terminated. Her dismissal came after a five-week investigation by Google, who claim that she violated the company's code of conduct and security policies. This came only a few weeks after the controversial departure of her former team co-lead Timnit Gebru in December 2020. Prior to her dismissal, Mitchell had been a vocal advocate for diversity at Google, and had voiced concerns about research censorship at the company.

During Fall 2021, she joins the Hugging Face company.

Leadership 
Mitchell is a member of the Partnership on AI and an advocate for diversity in technology. She is a co-founder of Widening NLP, a community of women and other under-represented researchers working in natural language processing, and a special interest group within the Association for Computational Linguistics.

References 

Alumni of the University of Aberdeen
American women computer scientists
American computer scientists
Computer scientists
Living people
Machine learning researchers
Natural language processing researchers
University of Washington alumni
Women computer scientists
Year of birth missing (living people)
21st-century American women